Lutibacter holmesii is a Gram-negative, strictly aerobic, rod-shaped and non-motile bacterium from the genus of Lutibacter which has been isolated from a sea urchin (Strongylocentrotus intermedius) from the Troitsa Bay in the Sea of Japan.

References

Flavobacteria
Bacteria described in 2015